Kerfourn is a commune in the Morbihan department of Brittany in north-western France. It is around 8 km east of Pontivy. Inhabitants of Kerfourn are called Kerfournois.

Governance
The first mayor from 1841 to 1871 was Mathurin le Guernic.
The actual mayor is Joël Marivain, elected in 2008, reelected in 2014 and 2020.

Landmarks

 Church Saint-Eloi-and-Saint-Vincent
 Fountain Saint-Eloi
 Fountain Saint-Vincent
 Calvary of Guerdaner
 Great Calvary
 Calvary of Pembual

See also
Communes of the Morbihan department

References

External links

Official site 

 Mayors of Morbihan Association 

Communes of Morbihan